The Demopolis City School District  is the city school district for Demopolis in Marengo County, Alabama.  It operates four schools within the city, which include U.S. Jones Elementary School, Westside Elementary School, Demopolis Middle School, and Demopolis High School. The system educates more than 2300 students and employs roughly 250.

References

Education in Marengo County, Alabama
School districts in Alabama